Vridhachalam is a legislative assembly constituency in Cuddalore district in the Indian state of Tamil Nadu. Before 2009, it was part of the Chidambaram Lok Sabha constituency. After 2009, it is a part of Cuddalore Lok Sabha constituency. This constituent was won by popular actor Vijaykanth, during the 2006 Assembly election, under his new party Desiya Murpokku Dravida Kazhagam. It is one of the 234 State Legislative Assembly Constituencies in Tamil Nadu.

Madras State

Tamil Nadu

Election Results

2021

2016

2011

2006

2001

1996

1991

1989

1984

1980

1977

1971

1967

1962

1957

1952

References 

 

Assembly constituencies of Tamil Nadu
Cuddalore district